Daniela Espinosa Arce (born 13 July 1999) is a Mexican professional footballer who plays as a forward for Liga MX Femenil side Tijuana and the Mexico women's national team.

International career
Espinosa represented Mexico at the 2014 Summer Youth Olympics, the 2016 CONCACAF Women's U-17 Championship, the 2016 FIFA U-17 Women's World Cup, the 2018 CONCACAF Women's U-20 Championship and the 2018 FIFA U-20 Women's World Cup. She made her senior debut on 27 February 2019 in a friendly match against Italy.

Honors and awards

International
Mexico U20
 CONCACAF Women's U-20 Championship: 2018

References

External links
 
 

1999 births
Living people
Women's association football forwards
Mexican women's footballers
Footballers from Baja California Sur
Mexican footballers
People from Cabo San Lucas
Mexico women's international footballers
Pan American Games competitors for Mexico
Footballers at the 2019 Pan American Games
Footballers at the 2014 Summer Youth Olympics
Liga MX Femenil players
Club América (women) footballers